The Green Hornet (French: Le frelon vert) is a 2006 French superhero short film, based on The Green Hornet character created by George W. Trendle and Fran Striker.

Plot
The Green Hornet attempts to prove his innocence by capturing a criminal; while tracking him, the Green Hornet is ambushed, and Green Hornet and Kato must fight off the goons and prove their innocence.

Cast
 Manu Lanzi as The Green Hornet
 Patrick Vo as Kato
 Alban Lenoir

See also
 Green Hornet
 Kato

References

External links
 The Green Hornet (Official Page) Short film directed by Aurélien Poitrimoult
 The film
 
  THE GREEN HORNET (LE FRELON VERT)

2006 films
French short films
Films based on television series
Martial arts films
French vigilante films
Fan films
The Green Hornet films
English-language French films
2000s English-language films
2000s French films